Ivan Ooze may refer to:
 Ivan Ooze (Power Rangers), a character in Mighty Morphin Power Rangers
 Ivan Ooze (rapper) (born 1992), an Australian rapper, songwriter, and musician